Joseph Schmitz may refer to:

Joseph A. Schmitz (1898–1994), member of the Wisconsin State Assembly
Joseph E. Schmitz (born 1956), American attorney and government official